Amatori Catania Rugby is an Italian rugby union club based in Catania. They are the only professional rugby union team in Sicily. The club was founded in 1963, and play at the Stadio Santa Maria Goretti.

Amatori Catania have thus far not won the Italian championship, but have qualified for European competition, competing in both the 2004–05 and 2005–06 European Challenge Cup seasons, defeating Montpellier and Connacht in the last season.

They currently competing in the Serie A.

History
Between 1963 and 1965 the first team played in Serie C but won promotion to Serie B. In 1969–70 they won promotion to Serie A, but managed to survive at this level for only one season. From the 1972–73 season to the 1987–88 season, for sixteen consecutive seasons, he always plays in Serie A. After a season in Serie A2, he won the playoffs, obtaining again the promotion to Serie A, where he remained for seven years. In the 1996–97 season they were relegated back to Serie A2 and two years later back to Serie B but managed to return to Serie A four years later.

The 2004–05 season, mark the return to the top division, which in the meantime has changed its name to Super 10, under the technical guidance of Orazio Arancio. The Amatori Catania, guided by the head coach Jean-Michel Vuillemin, is the revelation team: from newly promoted to the semifinals, but they were knocked out by Benetton Treviso with the scores of 20–25 at the Santa Maria Goretti and 21–41 at the Monigo.

The following season is certainly more troubled despite the experience of the international head coach Laurent Rodriguez, but after a complicated start the Amatori Catania managed to hit a difficult salvation after a strenuous fight with the Veneziamestre which ended only on the last day. Worthy of note are the victories in the 2005–06 European Challenge Cup against Montpellier and Connacht at the Santa Maria Goretti.

In the 2007-08 season, the Amatori Catania, guided by Michel Ringeval, disputed a decidedly subdued league, which on the sixteenth day sees it relegated with mathematical certainty in Serie A.

Statistics

European Challenge Cup

Selected former players

Italian players
Former players who have played for Amatori Catania and have caps for Italy:

  Orazio Arancio
  Ambrogio Bona
  Benjamin de Jager
  Alessandro Fusco
  Elio Fusco
  Jacob Gaina
  Salvatore Garozzo
  Marcello Gambino Urbanczyk
  Andrea Lo Cicero
  Massimiliano Perziano
  Juan Manuel Queirolo
  Diego Varani

Overseas players
Former players who have played for Calvisano and have caps for their respective country:

  Galo Alvarez Quiñones
  Lucas Barrera Oro
  Gonzalo Beccar Varela
  Gastón de Robertis
  Marcello Gambino Urbanczyk
  Alejandro Krancz
  Juan Pablo Lagarrigue
  Benjamín Madero
  Carlos Neyra
  Horacio San Martín
  Fabián Turnes
  Daniel Quate
  Sebastian Levaggi
  André Joubert
  Jono Fabian
  Paul Emerick

External links
 Official site

Italian rugby union teams
Catania